Birch is a surname. Notable people with the surname include:

 A. A. Birch Jr. (1932–2011), American lawyer and judge
 Adam Birch (born 1979), American wrestler
 Alice Birch (born 1986), British playwright and screenwriter
 Andreas Birch (1758–1829), Danish cleric and academic
 Arthur Birch (disambiguation), several people
 Bill Birch (born 1934), New Zealand politician
 Bob Birch (1956–2012), American musician
 Brian Birch (footballer, born 1938), played for Bolton Wanderers
 Brian Birch (1931–1989), English footballer
 Bryan Birch (born 1931), British mathematician
 Charles Birch (1918–2009), Australian geneticist, theologian and author
 Charles Bell Birch (1832–1893), English sculptor
 Charlie Birch (born 2001), English footballer
 Charlotte Birch-Pfeiffer (1800–1868), German actress and playwright
 Christian Birch-Reichenwald (1814–1891), Norwegian jurist and mayor of Oslo
 Chris Birch (stroke survivor) (born 1984), Welsh rugby player, self-described gay convert
 Chris Birch (game designer)
 Chris Birch (politician) (1950–2019), member of the Alaska Senate 
 Diane Birch (born 1983), American singer-songwriter
 Edmund Birch (1831–1875), Western Australian politician
 Elizabeth Birch (born 1956), American LGBT attorney
 Eugenius Birch (1818–1884), English seaside architect
 Francis Birch (cryptographer) (1889–1956), British cryptographer and actor
 Francis Birch (geophysicist) (1903–1992), American geophysicist
 Gary Birch (footballer) (born 1981), English footballer
 Gina Birch, English post-punk musician
 James Birch (disambiguation), several people
 Jeff Birch (1927–2005), English professional footballer
 Jim Birch (rugby union) (1889–1968), English-born rugby union player
 John Birch (disambiguation) several people
 Juno Birch (born 1993), English drag queen, sculptor, and YouTuber
 Lamorna Birch (1869–1955), English artist
 Leann Birch (1946–2019), American developmental psychologist
 Margaret Birch (1921–2020), Canadian politician
 Martin Birch (1948–2020), British music producer
 Michael Birch (disambiguation), several people
 Patricia Birch (born 1934), American choreographer, film and theatre director
 Paul Birch (disambiguation), several people
 Percy Birch (1860–?), English footballer
 Peter Birch-Reichenwald (1843–1898), Norwegian politician
 Reg Birch (1914–1994), British communist and trade unionist
 Reginald Bathurst Birch (1856–1943), English-American artist and illustrator
 Ric Birch (born 1945), Australian TV producer and event director
 Robert H. Birch (–), American western outlaw
 Robert L. Birch (1925–2005), American librarian and National Trivia Day creator
 Rosalie Birch (born 1983), English cricketer
 Ryan Birch (1969–2013), British judoka
 Samuel Birch (disambiguation), several people
 Sarah Birch (born 1963), American political scientist and academic
 Scholes Birch (1826–1910), English cricketer
 Stanley F. Birch Jr. (born 1945), US Circuit Judge
 Thomas Birch (disambiguation), several people
 Thora Birch (born 1982), American actress and producer
 Wallace Birch (1910–1987), English footballer
 Walter de Gray Birch (1842–1924), English historian
 William Birch (disambiguation), several people
Fictional characters
 Edna Birch, Peter Birch and Eve Birch, from the British TV soap Emmerdale
 Professor Birch, from the Pokémon series
 Simon Birch, main character of the eponymous 1998 American comedy-drama film

English-language surnames
English toponymic surnames